31 Senior High School Jakarta or Sekolah Menengah Atas (SMA) Negeri 31 Jakarta is one of the public schools in the Province of Jakarta, Indonesia. Similar to all high schools in Indonesia, there are three years of lessons, ranging from 10th Grade to 12th Grade. It was founded in 1978, and has 30 classes and 900 students (30 students/class for 10th Grade, 11th and 12th Science, 11th and 12th Social, and 20 students/class for 11th and 12th Language). 10th Grade has 10 classes from A to J, 11th and 12th Science have 4 classes, 11th and 12th Social have 4 classes, and 11th and 12th Language have only one class.

31 Senior High School is also one of 28 schools in Indonesia which is in cooperation with the German government through the Goethe-Institut's project "Schulen: Partner der Zukunft" or Schools: Partners of the Future. With this project 4-5 students of 31 Senior High School Jakarta will be sent annually to Germany to participate in the German Winter-course or Summer-course in cities in Germany for 3 weeks (per semester, in 11th grade).

External links 
 Official Homepage
 31 Senior High School, Jakarta on PASCH-Net

Schools in Jakarta